Mahawai is a rural municipality located in Kalikot District of Karnali Province of Nepal.

Gela, Odanaku and some parts of Chilkhaya which previously were all separate Village development committees merged to form this new local level body. Fulfilling the requirement of the new Constitution of Nepal 2015, Ministry of Federal Affairs and General Administration replaced all old VDCs and Municipalities into 753 new local level bodies.

The rural municipality is divided into total 7 wards and the headquarters of this newly formed rural municipality is situated at Odanaku.

References

External links
 Official website

Populated places in Kalikot District
Rural municipalities in Karnali Province
Rural municipalities of Nepal established in 2017